Another Side of This Life: The Lost Recordings of Gram Parsons is a compilation released in 2000 of early recordings by Gram Parsons. It features all previously unreleased recordings. The singing style and musical arrangements are much different from Parsons's subsequent, more country-influenced music.

Track listing
"Codine" (Buffy Sainte-Marie) – 5:37
"Wheel of Fortune" (Gram Parsons) – 2:29
"Another Side of This Life" (Fred Neil) – 2:40
"High Flyin' Bird" (Billy Edd Wheeler) – 3:49
"November Nights" (Parsons) – 3:38
"Zah's Blues" (Parsons) – 4:02
"Reputation" (Tim Hardin) – 3:09
"That's the Bag I'm In" (Fred Neil) – 3:14
"Willie Jean" (Traditional) – 4:08
"They Still Go Down" (Dick Weissman) – 2:26
"Pride of Man" (Hamilton Camp) – 2:45
"The Last Thing on My Mind" (Tom Paxton) – 3:44
"Hey Nellie Nellie" (David Fromer, Jonathan Fromer, Elbert Robinson) – 3:04
"She's the Woman I Love/Good Time Music" (Danny Adams, Sam Moffitt) – 4:58
"Brass Buttons" (Parsons) – 2:25
"I Just Can't Take It Anymore" (Parsons) – 3:29
"Searchin'" (Jerry Leiber, Mike Stoller) – 3:32
"Candy Man" (Rev. Gary Davis) – 3:17

Personnel 
Gram Parsonsacoustic guitar, vocals

References

Gram Parsons compilation albums
2000 compilation albums